Harold Harkavy (November 29, 1915 – November 29, 1965) was an American bridge player, considered one of the world's best at  play. 

He was originally from New York City, and served in Italy and Africa in World War II. He later from Miami Beach, Florida.

He died on his 50th birthday of pancreatitis in a French Hospital in San Francisco, where he had gone for the Fall National Championships. He was survived by his wife, Marie Franko Harkavy, and their son, Robert.

Harkavy was inducted into the ACBL Hall of Fame in 2004.

Bridge accomplishments

Honors

 ACBL Hall of Fame, 2004

Wins

 North American Bridge Championships (11)
 Wernher Open Pairs (1) 1953 
 Vanderbilt (1) 1963 
 Marcus Cup (1) 1946 
 Chicago Mixed Board-a-Match (4) 1952, 1953, 1955, 1957 
 Reisinger (1) 1952 
 Spingold (3) 1953, 1956, 1963

Runners-up

 North American Bridge Championships
 Wernher Open Pairs (1) 1952 
 Blue Ribbon Pairs (1) 1963 
 Mitchell Board-a-Match Teams (1) 1952 
 Chicago Mixed Board-a-Match (2) 1947, 1964 
 Reisinger (2) 1945, 1964

References

External links
 

1915 births
1965 deaths
American contract bridge players
People from Miami Beach, Florida
People from New York City
Deaths from pancreatitis